The Anthem of the Republic of Kosovo (Albanian: Himni i Republikës së Kosovës; Serbian: Химна Републике Косово / Himna Republike Kosovo) is anthem of the Republic of Kosovo. It was composed by Mendi Mengjiqi. As with the national anthems of Bosnia and Herzegovina, San Marino, and Spain, it has no official lyrics, but de facto lyrics are in use. It was adopted on 11 June 2008. It was chosen because it contained no references to any specific ethnic group. It was selected by the Assembly of Kosovo, with 72 MPs voting in favor, while 15 voted against, and five abstained.

History

On 12 March 2008 the Assembly of the Republic of Kosovo announced an open contest to choose a national anthem for the country in Pristina's newspapers and on the official website of the Assembly. The rules include:
 "Composition should be distinguishable: – should be unique and original"
 "Length of the composition should not last less than 30 seconds or more than 60 seconds."
 "Texts can be included as well in the application, in any official language of the Republic of Kosovo" however, the final adoption is believed not to include them. Choosing the text for the anthem would have been a difficult task because the majority of the population in Kosovo are Albanians, Serbs being the second largest ethnic group. The government has emphasised that no ethnic group should be discriminated against, declaring the state a "democratic, secular and multiethnic republic" thus making it difficult to find lyrics that do not favour one ethnic group over another one. Similar problems were encountered when choosing the flag. Furthermore, the rules also state that the proposal "Should not present or be similar to the hymn or popular song of any country, or hymn of any political party, movement or Institution of Republic of Kosovo, or to implicate any faithfulness towards any ethnic community of Republic of Kosovo."
 The proposals must be submitted by 31 March 2008.
 The composer of the adopted piece will be awarded €10,000 and two other qualified proposals will receive €7,000 and €5,000.

Lyrics

Other anthem candidates

Ode to Joy 
"Ode to Joy", the European continental anthem, was played at the official declaration ceremonies of the Republic of Kosovo. The government of the Republic of Kosovo decided to do this as a mark of respect to the European Union for its efforts on helping in gaining independence. It remained in use as a de facto national anthem until the official anthem was adopted a few weeks later.

Himni i Flamurit 
"Himni i Flamurit", the national anthem of Albania, has been widely used in Kosovo with other Albanian national symbols. It was also the state anthem of the unrecognized Republic of Kosova that existed from 1990 until 1999 when the province was taken into the control of the United Nations.

Kur ka ra kushtrimi n'Kosovë 
"Kur ka ra kushtrimi n'Kosovë", a song composed by Rauf Dhomi, was proposed by the former President of Kosovo, Ibrahim Rugova, as the state anthem in 2000. However, no decision was made back then. The anthem has lyrics in the Albanian language.

Notes

See also
National symbols of Kosovo

References

External links
 Complete official rules of the competition
 Reuters video news report about the competition
 Orchestral Version of Kosovo National Anthem
 Vocal version with de facto lyrics (archive link)
 Sheet Music

Kosovan music
National symbols of Kosovo
European anthems